Dane Laffrey is an American scenic designer best known for Broadway shows Once on This Island (2017), Spring Awakening (2015), and Fool for Love (2015), and Off-Broadway shows The Christians (2015), Cloud Nine (2015), and Rancho Viejo (2016).

Early life and education 
Laffrey was born in Michigan. He attended boarding school at Interlochen Arts Academy for his junior and senior years of high school. In 2002, he relocated to Sydney, Australia to study design at the National Institute of Dramatic Art. He graduated in 2004.

Career 
Laffrey first served as scenic designer and costume designer on Darlinghurst Theatre Company's production of Some Explicit Polaroids and Griffin Theatre Company's production of The Cold Child in 2006 in Sydney, Australia. He was nominated for a Sydney Theatre Award for Best Set Design for Some Explicit Polaroids that same year. The following year, he again served in both roles for the production of The Colour of Panic at Sydney Opera House in Sydney, Australia and Det Apne Teater in Oslo, Norway.

In 2007, he relocated to New York City where he began designing sets, costumes, and one time-lighting for multiple Off-Broadway, Off-Off-Broadway, and regional productions. Notable Off-Broadway productions include Lucas Hnath's The Christians, Dan LeFranc's Rancho Viejo, and Caryl Churchill's Cloud Nine. He was nominated for four American Theatre Wing Hewes Design Awards for Off-Broadway productions between 2010 and 2017.

In 2015, he served as the set designer for Manhattan Theatre Club's production of Fool for Love at The Friedman Theatre on Broadway and as both set designer and costume designer for Deaf West Theatre's production of Spring Awakening, performed in American Sign Language, at The Brooks Atkinson Theatre on Broadway.<ref>{{Cite news|url=https://fashionista.com/2015/08/dane-laffrey-spring-awakening-costumes|title=With 'Spring Awakenings Return to Broadway, its Period Costumes Get a Contemporary Refresh|work=Fashionista|access-date=2018-03-31|language=en}}</ref> In 2017, he served as set designer for Circle in the Square's production of Once On This Island on Broadway. Laffrey and Michael Arden, the show's director, took a research trip he took to Haiti which completely transformed his approach to designing the set for the production. Laffrey stated: "You cannot begin to describe the effect that trip had on me as a person but also in feeling equipped to responsibly bring this work to Broadway in 2017 in a way that was true to the piece and what it portrays ... Hurricane Maria happened in Puerto Rico and the storms that affected those tiny little islands in the Bahamas. We continued to collect and pull those images because it felt like ‘Island’ is ultimately dealing with, at its core, how you survive in the face of something like that and the restorative power of storytelling. You feel that connection of the human spirit threaded through all these places."His design for Once On This Island received widespread positive critical acclaim with multiple media outlets describing it as "a fractured paradisiac vision", "lush [and] immersive", "evocative", "ambitious", and "an aesthetic experience unlike anything else on Broadway."

In 2017, Laffrey was awarded the Obie Award for Sustained Excellence of Set and Costume Design.

Laffrey has served as an advisor for Lincoln Center Theatre's LCT3 and as a guest designer at Yale School of Music, the Juilliard School, New York University, Carnegie Mellon University, Interlochen Arts Academy, Western Sydney University, and the National Institute of Dramatic Art.

 Productions 

 Broadway productions 

 Off-Broadway and Off-Off-Broadway productions 

 Regional productions 

 International productions 

 Television productions 

 Awards and nominations 
In 2017, Laffrey was awarded the Obie Award for Sustained Excellence of Set and Costume Design.

In 2006, he was nominated for a Sydney Theatre Award for Best Set Design for Some Explicit Polaroids (2006). In 2010, he was nominated for a Drama Desk Award for Outstanding Lighting Design for The Boys in the Band (2010). In 2015, he was nominated for an Ovation Award for Best Scenic Design (Large Theatre) for Spring Awakening. He also has received multiple nominations for the American Theatre Wing Hewes Design Award, including for The Boys in the Band (2010), The Patsy (2012), The Maids (2012), I Remember Mama (2014), and Rancho Viejo'' (2017).

References

External links 
 Dane Laffrey Official Site

Year of birth missing (living people)
Living people
Theatre designers
American scenic designers
American set designers
American costume designers
American lighting designers
Broadway set designers
Obie Award recipients
National Institute of Dramatic Art alumni
Interlochen Center for the Arts alumni